Synapsids are one of the two major groups of animals that evolved from basal amniotes, the other being the sauropsids, the group that includes reptiles and birds. The group includes mammals and every animal more closely related to mammals than to sauropsids. Unlike other amniotes, synapsids have a single temporal fenestra, an opening low in the skull roof behind each eye orbit, leaving a bony arch beneath each; this accounts for their name. The distinctive temporal fenestra developed about 318 million years ago during the Late Carboniferous period, when synapsids and sauropsids diverged, but was subsequently merged with the orbit in early mammals.

Traditionally, non-mammalian synapsids were believed to have evolved from reptiles, and therefore described as mammal-like reptiles in classical systematics, and primitive synapsids were also referred to as pelycosaurs, or pelycosaur-grade synapsids. These paraphyletic terms have now fallen into disfavor and are only used informally (if at all) in modern literature, because it is now known that synapsids are not reptiles, nor are they part of reptilian lineage in a cladistical sense. They are now more correctly referred to as stem mammals, and sometimes as proto-mammals, or paramammals.

Synapsids were the largest terrestrial vertebrates in the Permian period, 299 to 251 million years ago, equalled only by some large pareiasaurs at the end of the Permian. Most lineages of pelycosaur-grade synapsids were replaced at the end of Early Permian by the more advanced therapsids. Synapsid numbers and variety were severely reduced by the Permian–Triassic extinction event. Only the therapsid dicynodonts and eutheriodonts (consisting of Therocephalia and Cynodontia) are known to have continued into the Triassic period. The cynodont group Probainognathia, which includes Mammaliaformes (mammals and their closer ancestors), were the only synapsids to survive beyond the Triassic.

During the Triassic, the sauropsid archosaurs became the largest and most numerous land vertebrates, and gave rise to the dinosaurs. When all non-avian dinosaurs were wiped out by the Cretaceous–Paleogene extinction event, the mammalian synapsids diversified again to become the largest land and marine animals on Earth.

Linnaean and cladistic classifications

At the turn of the 20th century synapsids were thought to be one of the four main subclasses of reptiles. However, this notion was disproved upon closer inspection of skeletal remains, as synapsids are differentiated from reptiles by their distinctive temporal openings. These openings in the skull bones allowed the attachment of larger jaw muscles, hence a more efficient bite.

Synapsids were subsequently considered to be a later reptilian lineage that became mammals by gradually evolving increasingly mammalian features, hence the name "mammal-like reptiles" (also known as pelycosaurs). These became the traditional terms for all Paleozoic (early) synapsids. More recent studies have debunked this notion as well, and reptiles are now classified within Sauropsida (sauropsids), the sister group to synapsids, thus making synapsids their own taxonomic group.

As a result, the paraphyletic terms "mammal-like reptile" and "pelycosaur" are seen as outdated and disfavored in technical literature, and the term stem mammal (or sometimes protomammal or paramammal) is used instead. Phylogenetically, it is now understood that synapsids comprise an independent branch of the tree of life. The monophyly of Synapsida is not in doubt, and the expressions such as "Synapsida contains the mammals" and "synapsids gave rise to the mammals" both express the same phylogenetic hypothesis. This terminology reflects the modern cladistical approach to animal relationships, according to which the only valid groups are those that include all of the descendants of a common ancestor: these are known as monophyletic groups, or clades. 

Additionally, Reptilia (reptiles) has been revised into a monophyletic group and is considered entirely distinct from Synapsida, falling within Sauropsida, the sister group of Synapsida within Amniota.

Primitive and advanced synapsids
The synapsids are traditionally divided for convenience, into therapsids, an advanced group of synapsids and the branch within which mammals evolved, and stem mammals, (previously known as pelycosaurs), comprising the other six more primitive families of synapsids. Stem mammals were all rather lizard-like, with sprawling gait and possibly horny scutes, while therapsids tended to have a more erect pose and possibly hair, at least in some forms. In traditional taxonomy, the Synapsida encompasses two distinct grades: the low-slung stem mammals have given rise to the more erect therapsids, who in their turn have given rise to the mammals. In traditional vertebrate classification, the stem mammals and therapsids were both considered orders of the subclass Synapsida.

Practical versus phylogenetic usage of “synapsid” and “therapsid” 
In phylogenetic nomenclature, the terms are used somewhat differently, as the daughter clades are included. Most papers published during the 21st century have treated "Pelycosaur" as an informal grouping of primitive members. Therapsida has remained in use as a clade containing both the traditional therapsid families and mammals.

Although Synapsida and Therapsida includes modern mammals, in practical usage, those two terms are used almost exclusively when referring to the more basal members that lie outside of Mammaliaformes.

Characteristics

Temporal openings

Synapsids evolved a temporal fenestra behind each eye orbit on the lateral surface of the skull. It may have provided new attachment sites for jaw muscles. A similar development took place in the diapsids, which evolved two rather than one opening behind each eye. Originally, the openings in the skull left the inner cranium covered only by the jaw muscles, but in higher therapsids and mammals, the sphenoid bone has expanded to close the opening. This has left the lower margin of the opening as an arch extending from the lower edges of the braincase.

Teeth

Synapsids are characterized by having differentiated teeth. These include the canines, molars, and incisors. The trend towards differentiation is found in some labyrinthodonts and early anapsid reptilians in the form of enlargement of the first teeth on the maxilla, forming a form of protocanines. This trait was subsequently lost in the diapsid line, but developed further in the synapsids. Early synapsids could have two or even three enlarged "canines", but in the therapsids, the pattern had settled to one canine in each upper jaw half. The lower canines developed later.

Jaw
The jaw transition is a good classification tool, as most other fossilized features that make a chronological progression from a reptile-like to a mammalian condition follow the progression of the jaw transition. The mandible, or lower jaw, consists of a single, tooth-bearing bone in mammals (the dentary), whereas the lower jaw of modern and prehistoric reptiles consists of a conglomeration of smaller bones (including the dentary, articular, and others). As they evolved in synapsids, these jaw bones were reduced in size and either lost or, in the case of the articular, gradually moved into the ear, forming one of the middle ear bones: while modern mammals possess the malleus, incus and stapes, basal synapsids (like all other tetrapods) possess only a stapes. The malleus is derived from the articular (a lower jaw bone), while the incus is derived from the quadrate (a cranial bone).

Mammalian jaw structures are also set apart by the dentary-squamosal jaw joint. In this form of jaw joint, the dentary forms a connection with a depression in the squamosal known as the glenoid cavity. In contrast, all other jawed vertebrates, including reptiles and nonmammalian synapsids, possess a jaw joint in which one of the smaller bones of the lower jaw, the articular, makes a connection with a bone of the cranium called the quadrate bone to form the articular-quadrate jaw joint. In forms transitional to mammals, the jaw joint is composed of a large, lower jaw bone (similar to the dentary found in mammals) that does not connect to the squamosal, but connects to the quadrate with a receding articular bone.

Palate
Over time, as synapsids became more mammalian and less 'reptilian', they began to develop a secondary palate, separating the mouth and nasal cavity. In early synapsids, a secondary palate began to form on the sides of the maxilla, still leaving the mouth and nostril connected.

Eventually, the two sides of the palate began to curve together, forming a U shape instead of a C shape. The palate also began to extend back toward the throat, securing the entire mouth and creating a full palatine bone. The maxilla is also closed completely. In fossils of one of the first eutheriodonts, the beginnings of a palate are clearly visible. The later Thrinaxodon has a full and completely closed palate, forming a clear progression.

Skin and fur

In addition to the glandular skin covered in fur found in most modern mammals, modern and extinct synapsids possess a variety of modified skin coverings, including osteoderms (bony armor embedded in the skin), scutes (protective structures of the dermis often with a horny covering), hair or fur, and scale-like structures (often formed from modified hair, as in pangolins and some rodents). While the skin of reptiles is rather thin, that of mammals has a thick dermal layer.

The ancestral skin type of synapsids has been subject to discussion. Among the early synapsids, only two species of small varanopids have been found to possess scutes; fossilized rows of osteoderms indicate horny armour on the neck and back, and skin impressions indicate some possessed rectangular scutes on their undersides and tails. The pelycosaur scutes probably were nonoverlapping dermal structures with a horny overlay, like those found in modern crocodiles and turtles. These differed in structure from the scales of lizards and snakes, which are an epidermal feature (like mammalian hair or avian feathers). Recently, skin impressions from the genus Ascendonanus suggest that at least varanopsids developed scales similar to those of squamates.

It is currently unknown exactly when mammalian characteristics such as body hair and mammary glands first appeared, as the fossils only rarely provide direct evidence for soft tissues. An exceptionally well-preserved skull of Estemmenosuchus, a therapsid from the Upper Permian, preserves smooth skin with what appear to be glandular depressions, an animal noted as being semi-aquatic. The oldest known fossil showing unambiguous imprints of hair is the Callovian (late middle Jurassic) Castorocauda and several contemporary haramiyidans, both non-mammalian mammaliaform (see below, however). More primitive members of the Cynodontia are also hypothesized to have had fur or a fur-like covering based on their inferred warm-blooded metabolism. While more direct evidence of fur in early cynodonts has been proposed in the form of small pits on the snout possibly associated with whiskers, such pits are also found in some reptiles that lack whiskers. There is evidence that some other non-mammalian cynodonts more basal than Castorocauda, such as Morganucodon, had Harderian glands, which are associated with the grooming and maintenance of fur. The apparent absence of these glands in non-mammaliaformes may suggest that fur did not originate until that point in synapsid evolution. It is possible that fur and associated features of true warm-bloodedness did not appear until some synapsids became extremely small and nocturnal, necessitating a higher metabolism. The oldest examples of nocturnality in synapsids is believed to have been in species that lived more than 300 million years ago.

However, Permian coprolites from Russia showcase that at least some synapsids did already have fur in this epoch. These are the oldest impressions of hair on synapsids.

Mammary glands 
Early synapsids, as far back as their known evolutionary debut in the Late Carboniferous period, may have laid parchment-shelled (leathery) eggs, which lacked a calcified layer, as most modern reptiles and monotremes do. This may also explain why there is no fossil evidence for synapsid eggs to date. Because they were vulnerable to desiccation, secretions from apocrine-like glands may have helped keep the eggs moist.

According to Oftedal, early synapsids may have buried the eggs into moisture laden soil, hydrating them with contact with the moist skin, or may have carried them in a moist pouch, similar to that of monotremes (echidnas carry their eggs and offspring via a temporary pouch), though this would limit the mobility of the parent. The latter may have been the primitive form of egg care in synapsids rather than simply burying the eggs, and the constraint on the parent's mobility would have been solved by having the eggs "parked" in nests during foraging or other activities and periodically be hydrated, allowing higher clutch sizes than could fit inside a pouch (or pouches) at once, and large eggs, which would be cumbersome to carry in a pouch, would be easier to care for. The basis of Oftedal's speculation is the fact that many species of anurans can carry eggs or tadpoles attached to the skin, or embedded within cutaneous "pouches" and how most salamanders curl around their eggs to keep them moist, both groups also having glandular skin.

The glands involved in this mechanism would later evolve into true mammary glands with multiple modes of secretion in association with hair follicles. Comparative analyses of the evolutionary origin of milk constituents support a scenario in which the secretions from these glands evolved into a complex, nutrient-rich milk long before true mammals arose (with some of the constituents possibly predating the split between the synapsid and sauropsid lines). Cynodonts were almost certainly able to produce this, which allowed a progressive decline of yolk mass and thus egg size, resulting in increasingly altricial hatchlings as milk became the primary source of nutrition, which is all evidenced by the small body size, the presence of epipubic bones, and limited tooth replacement in advanced cynodonts, as well as in mammaliaforms.

Patagia
Aerial locomotion first began in non-mammalian haramiyidan cynodonts, with Arboroharamiya, Xianshou, Maiopatagium and Vilevolodon bearing exquisitely preserved, fur-covered wing membranes that stretch across the limbs and tail. Their fingers are elongated, similar to those of bats and colugos and likely sharing similar roles both as wing supports and to hang on tree branches.

Within true mammals, aerial locomotion first occurs in volaticotherian eutriconodonts. A fossil Volaticotherium has an exquisitely preserved furry patagium with delicate wrinkles and that is very extensive, "sandwiching" the poorly preserved hands and feet and extending to the base of the tail. Argentoconodon, a close relative, shares a similar femur adapted for flight stresses, indicating a similar lifestyle.

Therian mammals would only achieve powered flight and gliding long after these early aeronauts became extinct, with the earliest-known gliding metatherians and bats evolving in the Paleocene.

Metabolism
Recently, it has been found that endothermy was developed as early as Ophiacodon in the late Carboniferous. The presence of fibrolamellar, a specialised type of bone that can grow quickly while maintaining a stable structure, shows that Ophiacodon would have used its high internal body temperature to fuel a fast growth comparable to modern endotherms.

Evolutionary history

Asaphestera, Archaeothyris and Clepsydrops, the earliest-known synapsids, lived in the Pennsylvanian subperiod (323–299 mya) of the Carboniferous period and were one of many types of primitive synapsids that are now informally grouped together as stem mammals or sometimes as protomammals (previously known as pelycosaurs). They were sprawling, bulky, possibly cold-blooded, and had small brains. Some, such as Dimetrodon, had large sails that might have helped raise their body temperature. A few relict groups lasted into the later Permian but, by the middle of the Late Permian, all had either died off or evolved into their successors, the therapsids.

The therapsids, a more advanced group of synapsids, appeared during the Middle Permian and included the largest terrestrial animals in the Middle and Late Permian. They included herbivores and carnivores, ranging from small animals the size of a rat (e.g.: Robertia), to large, bulky herbivores a ton or more in weight (e.g.: Moschops). After flourishing for many millions of years, these successful animals were all but wiped out by the Permian–Triassic mass extinction about 250 mya, the largest known extinction in Earth's history, possibly related to the Siberian Traps volcanic event.

Only a few therapsids went on to be successful in the new early Triassic landscape; they include Lystrosaurus and Cynognathus, the latter of which appeared later in the early Triassic. However, they were accompanied by the early archosaurs (soon to give rise to the dinosaurs). Some of these archosaurs, such as Euparkeria, were small and lightly built, while others, such as Erythrosuchus, were as big as or bigger than the largest therapsids.

After the Permian extinction, the synapsids did not count more than three surviving clades. The first comprised the therocephalians, which only lasted the first 20 million years of the Triassic period. The second were specialised, beaked herbivores known as dicynodonts (such as the Kannemeyeriidae), which contained some members that reached large size (up to a tonne or more). And finally there were the increasingly mammal-like carnivorous, herbivorous, and insectivorous cynodonts, including the eucynodonts from the Olenekian age, an early representative of which was Cynognathus.

Unlike the dicynodonts, which were large, the cynodonts became progressively smaller and more mammal-like as the Triassic progressed, though some forms like Trucidocynodon remained large. The first mammaliaforms evolved from the cynodonts during the early Norian age of the Late Triassic, about 225 mya.

During the evolutionary succession from early therapsid to cynodont to eucynodont to mammal, the main lower jaw bone, the dentary, replaced the adjacent bones. Thus, the lower jaw gradually became just one large bone, with several of the smaller jaw bones migrating into the inner ear and allowing sophisticated hearing.

Whether through climate change, vegetation change, ecological competition, or a combination of factors, most of the remaining large cynodonts (belonging to the Traversodontidae) and dicynodonts (of the family Kannemeyeriidae) had disappeared by the Rhaetian age, even before the Triassic–Jurassic extinction event that killed off most of the large non-dinosaurian archosaurs. The remaining Mesozoic synapsids were small, ranging from the size of a shrew to the badger-like mammal Repenomamus.

During the Jurassic and Cretaceous, the remaining non-mammalian cynodonts were small, such as Tritylodon. No cynodont grew larger than a cat. Most Jurassic and Cretaceous cynodonts were herbivorous, though some were carnivorous. The family Tritheledontidae, which first appeared near the end of the Triassic, was carnivorous and persisted well into the Middle Jurassic. The other, Tritylodontidae, first appeared at the same time as the tritheledonts, but was herbivorous. This group became extinct at the end of the Early Cretaceous epoch. Dicynodonts are thought to have become extinct near the end of the Triassic period, but there is evidence this group survived. New fossil finds have been found in the Cretaceous rocks of Gondwana.

Today, the 5,500 species of living synapsids, known as the mammals, include both aquatic (whales) and flying (bats) species, and the largest animal ever known to have existed (the blue whale). Humans are synapsids, as well. Most mammals are viviparous and give birth to live young rather than laying eggs with the exception being the monotremes.

Triassic and Jurassic ancestors of living mammals, along with their close relatives, had high metabolic rates. This meant consuming food (generally thought to be insects) in much greater quantity. To facilitate rapid digestion, these synapsids evolved mastication (chewing) and specialized teeth that aided chewing. Limbs also evolved to move under the body instead of to the side, allowing them to breathe more efficiently during locomotion. This helped make it possible to support their higher metabolic demands.

Relationships
Below is a cladogram of the most commonly accepted phylogeny of synapsids, showing a long stem lineage including Mammalia and successively more basal clades such as Theriodontia, Therapsida and Sphenacodontia:

Most uncertainty in the phylogeny of synapsids lies among the earliest members of the group, including forms traditionally placed within Pelycosauria. As one of the earliest phylogenetic analyses, Brinkman & Eberth (1983) placed the family Varanopidae with Caseasauria as the most basal offshoot of the synapsid lineage. Reisz (1986) removed Varanopidae from Caseasauria, placing it in a more derived position on the stem. While most analyses find Caseasauria to be the most basal synapsid clade, Benson's analysis (2012) placed a clade containing Ophiacodontidae and Varanopidae as the most basal synapsids, with Caseasauria occupying a more derived position. Benson attributed this revised phylogeny to the inclusion of postcranial characteristics, or features of the skeleton other than the skull, in his analysis. When only cranial or skull features were included, Caseasauria remained the most basal synapsid clade. Below is a cladogram modified from Benson's analysis (2012):

However, more recent examination of the phylogeny of basal synapsids, incorporating newly described basal caseids and eothyridids, returned Caseasauria to its position as the sister to all other synapsids. Brocklehurst et al. (2016) demonstrated that many of the postcranial characters used by Benson (2012) to unite Caseasauria with Sphenacodontidae and Edaphosauridae were absent in the newly discovered postcranial material of eothyridids, and were therefore acquired convergently.

See also
 Anapsid
 Diapsid
 Euryapsida
 Lists of synapsids
 Mammal classification
 List of prehistoric mammals
 Timeline of the evolutionary history of life
 Vertebrate paleontology

Notes

References

Further reading

External links

 Synapsida - Pelycosauria - at Palaeos
 Transitional Vertebrate Fossils - includes description of important transitional genera in the evolutionary sequence linking primitive synapsids to mammals

 
Tetrapod unranked clades
Extant Pennsylvanian first appearances
Taxa named by Henry Fairfield Osborn